Ta Nei is a late 12th century stone temple in Angkor, Cambodia. Built during the reign of King Jayavarman VII, it is near the northwest corner of the East Baray, a large holy reservoir. It was dedicated to the Buddha.

Plan  
Ta Nei was extended initially toward the east and then enlarged with three small gopuras on the north, west and south and a large east gopura that is essentially a part of the inner, galleried enclosure. As at Ta Prohm, city walls were begun but were probably never finished. Today only two outer gopuras exist to the west and east.

The length of the urban enclosure was 190m. Inside are two long, narrow tank moats on the north and south. The original east gopura now stands isolated, and the original northeast and southeast corner towers are now part of the gallery.

There is a small library near the south side and a chamber connects the sanctuary to the north gopura.

Gallery

See also 
 Banteay Kdei
 Bayon
 Ta Prohm
 Ta Prohm Kel
 Ta Som

References

Notes 

Angkorian sites in Siem Reap Province